Randy Brooks may refer to:

Randy Brooks (actor) (born 1950), American television and film actor
Randy Brooks (musician) (1919–1967), American jazz trumpeter and bandleader 
Randy Brooks, American musician and composer of the 1977 Christmas novelty song "Grandma Got Run Over by a Reindeer"